The Tullyvallen massacre took place on 1 September 1975, when Irish republican gunmen attacked an Orange Order meeting hall at Tullyvallen, near Newtownhamilton in County Armagh, Northern Ireland. The Orange Order is an Ulster Protestant and unionist brotherhood. Five Orangemen were killed and seven wounded in the shooting. The "South Armagh Republican Action Force" claimed responsibility, saying it was retaliation for a string of attacks on Catholic civilians by Loyalists. It is believed members of the Provisional IRA carried out the attack, despite the organisation being on ceasefire.

Background
On 10 February 1975, the Provisional IRA and British government entered into a truce and restarted negotiations. The IRA agreed to halt attacks on the British security forces, and the security forces mostly ended their raids and searches. There was a rise in sectarian killings during the truce. Loyalists, fearing they were about to be forsaken by the British government and forced into a united Ireland, increased their attacks on Irish Catholics/nationalists. They hoped to force the IRA to retaliate and thus end the truce. Some IRA units concentrated on tackling the loyalists. The fall-off of regular operations had caused unruliness within the IRA and some members, with or without permission from higher up, engaged in tit-for-tat killings.

On 22 August, loyalists killed three Catholic civilians in a gun and bomb attack on a pub in Armagh. Two days later, loyalists shot dead two Catholic civilians after stopping their car at a fake British Army checkpoint in the Tullyvallen area. Both of these attacks have been linked to the Glenanne gang. On 30 August, loyalists killed two more Catholic civilians in a gun and bomb attack on a pub in Belfast.

Orange Hall attack
On the night of 1 September, a group of Orangemen were holding a meeting in their isolated Orange hall in the rural area of Tullyvallen. At about 10pm, two masked gunmen burst into the hall armed with assault rifles and sprayed it with bullets while others stood outside and fired through the windows. The Orangemen scrambled for cover. One of them was an off-duty Royal Ulster Constabulary (RUC) officer. He returned fire with a pistol and believed he hit one of the attackers. Five of the Orangemen, all Protestants, were killed while seven others were wounded.  Before leaving, the attackers also planted a 2-pound bomb outside the hall, but it failed to detonate.

The victims were John Johnston (80), James McKee (73) and his son Ronnie McKee (40), Nevin McConnell (48), and William Herron (68) who died two days later. They all belonged to Tullyvallen Guiding Star Temperance Orange Lodge. Three of the dead were former members of the Ulster Special Constabulary.

Aftermath
A caller to the BBC claimed responsibility for the attack on behalf of the "South Armagh Republican Action Force" or "South Armagh Reaction Force", saying it was retaliation for "the assassinations of fellow Catholics".  The Irish Times reported on 10 September: "The Provisional IRA has told the British government that dissident members of its organisation were responsible" and "stressed that the shooting did not have the consent of the organisation's leadership".

In response to the attack, the Orange Order called for the creation of a legal militia (or "Home Guard") to deal with republican paramilitaries. The attack triggered a sudden expansion of loyalist paramilitaries' activities in Scotland, whose supporters were crucial in supplying weapons and funds to them.

Some of the rifles used in the attack were later used in the Kingsmill massacre in January 1976, when ten Protestant workmen were killed. Like the Tullyvallen massacre, it was claimed by the "South Armagh Reaction Force" (a cover name for IRA operatives in some operations at the time) as retaliation for the killing of Catholics elsewhere.

In November 1977, 22-year-old Cullyhanna man John Anthony McCooey was convicted of driving the gunmen to and from the scene and of IRA membership. He was also convicted of involvement in the killings of UDR soldier Joseph McCullough—chaplain of Tullyvallen Orange lodge—in February 1976, and UDR soldier Robert McConnell in April 1976.

See also
Darkley killings

References

1975 in Northern Ireland
The Troubles in County Armagh
Deaths by firearm in Northern Ireland
Massacres in Northern Ireland
Mass murder in 1975
Orange Order
1970s mass shootings in the United Kingdom
1975 murders in the United Kingdom
Mass shootings in Northern Ireland
Massacres in 1975
September 1975 events in the United Kingdom
Massacres of Protestants